Neocollyris purpureomaculata is a species of ground beetle in the genus Neocollyris in the family Carabidae. It was described by Horn in 1922.

References

Purpureomaculata, Neocollyris
Beetles described in 1922